Poisoning the well (or to poison the well) is a logical fallacy.

Poisoning the well may also refer to:

Well poisoning, the literal meaning of the phrase
"Poisoning the Well", a Stargate Atlantis episode
Poison the Well (band), a hardcore punk band from Florida formed in 1997
"Poison the Well", a 2019 song by American band Modest Mouse